Joyce Wieland  (June 30, 1930 – June 27, 1998) was a Canadian experimental filmmaker and mixed media artist. Wieland found success as a painter when she began her career in Toronto in the 1950s. In 1962, Wieland moved to New York City and expanded her career as an artist by including new materials and mixed media work. During that time, she also rose to prominence as an experimental filmmaker and soon, institutions such as the Museum of Modern Art in New York were showing her films. In 1971, Wieland's True Patriot Love exhibition was the first solo exhibition by a living Canadian female artist at the National Gallery of Canada. In 1982, Wieland received the honour of an Officer of the Order of Canada and in 1987, she was awarded the Toronto Arts Foundation's Visual Arts Award. She was also a member of the Royal Canadian Academy of Arts.

Biography

Early life and education 
Wieland was born on June 30, 1930 in Toronto, Ontario, Canada to British immigrant parents. She was the daughter of Sydney Arthur Wieland and Rosetta Amelia Watson. Wieland's father died from heart disease in 1937, and her mother followed soon after, leaving three children in financially difficult circumstances. Joyce Wieland's aptitude for art was first expressed during her youth, when she made many drawings and comic books.

As a teenager, she attended Central Technical School, where she studied commercial art and graphic design. Wieland first  enrolled in dress design and hoped it would help her land a job since she thought art would not be financially rewarding. However, at Central Tech, she met Doris McCarthy who taught at the school. McCarthy's artistic identity inspired Wieland to pursue her own. She saw potential in Wieland and convinced her to transfer into the art department.

Career 
After graduating in 1948, Wieland held various jobs as a graphic designer. Wieland's first job was with E.S. & A. Robinson in design packaging, followed by work as a designer at Planned Sales. While working for these agencies, Wieland interacted with many artists and fellow alumni from Central Tech and the Ontario College of Art. During this time, she also kept focusing on her art but wasn't confident in showing off her work yet.

In the early 1950s, Wieland's interest in art films grew and she started attending the Toronto Film Society screenings where she was introduced to the works of filmmakers such as Maya Deren, who later influenced her own films. In 1953, Wieland joined Graphic Associates, an animation studio where she learned techniques she would later apply in her own films.

She had her first solo exhibition in 1960 at the Isaacs Gallery in Toronto, making her the only woman that the prestigious gallery represented and earning her greater recognition for her work. She moved to New York in 1962 and throughout the decade produced most of her experimental films. One of these films is Rat Life and Diet in North America (1968), which presents animals as its main characters. The film is a metaphor for revolution and escape, where cats are the oppressors and the gerbils are the oppressed. The gerbils represent political prisoners in the United States who make their way to freedom in Canada. Rat Life and Diet in North America is an example of how Wieland's concern with political issues, nationalism, symbols, and myths was represented aesthetically through her works. 

Wieland's self-identification as a feminist in an era of second wave of feminism also manifested itself through aesthetic means and played an important part in her career as an artist. However, her visual-art practice's popularity remained confined within Canada.

Wieland returned to Toronto in 1971. She said she could not make art anymore in America due to its ideological orientation. Her 1976 film, The Far Shore, had had "devastating appraisals and dismal box office receipts". Following this, her next project—a dramatization of Margaret Laurence's iconic 1974 novel The Diviners — did not get off the ground. In 1987 a retrospective of her work at the Art Gallery of Ontario presented a critical overview of both her visual art practice and her experimental films.

Work
Joyce Wieland was a central figure in Canadian art during the 1960s and 1970s. Though, she began her career as a painter, her work came to explore a wide range of materials and media, including film. The 1960s were a productive time for Wieland, as she responded to the contemporary artistic trends of Pop art and Conceptual art. Joanne Sloane maintains in Joyce Wieland: Life & Work that her encounters with these influences "were always original and idiosyncratic." Sloane identifies the several consistent bodies of Wieland's work that emerged throughout the 1960s as: "quasi-abstract paintings that reveal messages, signs, or erotic drawings; collages and sculptural assemblages; filmic paintings; disaster paintings; plastic film-assemblages; quilts and other fabric-based objects; and language-based works." Her art was often infused with humour, even as it engaged with issues of war, gender, ecology, and nationalism.

Internationally, Wieland is best known as an experimental feminist filmmaker. Her works introduced physical manipulation of the filmstrip that inscribed an explicitly female craft tradition into her films while also playing with the facticity of photographed images. Wieland's output was small but received considerable attention in comparison to other female avant-garde filmmakers of her time. In the 1980s, Wieland focused again on painting, though her representation of the natural environment became less identifiably Canadian and her themes simply ones of nature, love and life.

Personal life
In 1956, Wieland married filmmaker Michael Snow, whom she had met through her job at the animation studio. They remained married for over twenty years until their divorce in 1976. In 1962, Wieland and Snow moved to New York where they lived until 1971.

After she moved back to Toronto in 1971, Wieland maintained a studio practice there until her death on June 27, 1998 from Alzheimer's disease, aged 67.

Filmography

Films about Joyce Wieland
 Artist on Fire (Canada, 1987), directed by Kay Armatage

Visual art 
 Untitled (Young Couple) (c.1959) (National Gallery of Canada)
 The Lovers No.23 (1961) (National Gallery of Canada)
 Red Fall (1962) (National Gallery of Canada)
 Boat (Homage to D.W. Griffith) (1963) (Private Collection)
 Boat Tragedy (1964) (Art Gallery of Ontario)
 This piece includes a multi-framed painting of a sinking sailboat. Variations on this work include sinking boats, ocean liners, and plane crashes.
 The Camera's Eyes (1966) (Art Gallery of Hamilton)
 Man Has Reached Out and Touched the Tranquil Moon (1970) (National Gallery of Canada)
 Barren Ground Caribou (1978) (Spadina Subway Station TTC)
 The Birth of Perception (1981) (National Gallery of Canada)

Influences on other work
In 2014, the focus of artist Mark Clintberg's Fogo Island residency was a quilted response to Wieland's work Reason Over Passion. The original work, made in both English and French, was inspired by the motto of the then-Prime Minister Pierre Elliot Trudeau. The quilt was infamously torn apart by his wife, Margaret Trudeau, in a fit of rage at his cold logic during an argument. In her autobiography Beyond Reason (1979), Trudeau narrates that encounter:

Clintberg's response, sewn in collaboration with the Wind and Waves Artisans' Guild, turns Wieland's work on its head, formally and literally as each piece of the quilt is stitched "wrong"-side up exposing its soft-coloured underbelly. Moreover in the figurative sense, his re-imagining renewed the need for passion instead of reason that Margaret pleaded in her rage. Unlike Wieland's quilts, which hung on the wall, Clintberg's quilts are placed on a random bed each night at the Fogo Island Inn.

Awards
 * Victor Martyn Lynch-Staunton Award (1972)

References

Further reading
Elder, Kathryn. The Films of Joyce Wieland, Toronto: Cinematheque Ontario, 1999. 
Holmes-Moss, Kristy A. "Negotiating the Nation: 'Expanding' the Work of Joyce Wieland" Canadian Journal of Film Studies, vol. 15, no. 2, pp 20–43

Nowell, Iris. A Life in Art, Toronto: ECW Press, 2001. 
Rabinovitz, Lauren. Points of Resistance. Women, Power & Politics in the New York Avant-garde Cinema, 1943-1971. Second edition. Urbana and Chicago: Univ. of Illinois Press, 2003. 
Sloan, Johanne. Joyce Wieland: Life & Work. Toronto: Art Canada Institute, 2014. 
Sloan, Johanne. Joyce Wieland's the Far Shore (Canadian Cinema), Univ of Toronto Press, 2010.

External links
  Installation views of Joyce Wieland’s “True Patriot Love” exhibition at the National Gallery of Canada, July 2 to August 8, 1971, Canadian Art online
 Joyce Wieland at the Canadian Women Film Directors Database
 Joyce Wieland fonds at the Clara Thomas Archives & Special Collections, York University Libraries, Toronto, Ontario
Joyce Wieland fonds at the National Gallery of Canada, Ottawa, Ontario

1930 births
1998 deaths
20th-century Canadian painters
20th-century Canadian women artists
Artists from Toronto
Canadian cinematographers
Canadian experimental filmmakers
Canadian mixed media artists
Canadian women cinematographers
Canadian conceptual artists
Women conceptual artists
Canadian women film directors
Canadian women painters
Neurological disease deaths in Ontario
Deaths from Alzheimer's disease
Film directors from Toronto
Members of the Royal Canadian Academy of Arts
Officers of the Order of Canada
Women experimental filmmakers
Canadian feminists
Deaths from dementia in Canada
Canadian expatriates in the United States